Épinay is a former commune in the Eure department in the Normandy region in north-western France. On 1 January 2016, it was merged into the new commune of Mesnil-en-Ouche.

Population

See also
Communes of the Eure department

References

Former communes of Eure